Lie-Liang Yang is a Chinese-born computer scientist. He is the professor of wireless communications in the School of Electronics and Computer Science, at the University of Southampton, United Kingdom.

Biography
He received his Master of Engineering and Doctor of Philosophy degrees in communications and electronics from (Northern) Beijing Jiaotong University in 1991 and 1997, respectively, and his Bachelor of Engineering degree in communications engineering from Shanghai Tiedao University in 1988. 

He was named Fellow of the Institute of Electrical and Electronics Engineers (IEEE) in 2016 for contributions to multicarrier communications and wireless transceivers, and a Fellow of the Institute of Engineering and Technology (IET) in 2011. He was a distinguished lecturer of the IEEE Vehicular Technology Society in 2016-2017.

Published books
Hanzo, Lajos, Maunder, Robert G., Wang, Jin, Yang, Lie-Liang. Near-Capacity Variable-Length Coding (Wiley; 2010) 
Yang, Lie-Liang. Multicarrier Communications (Wiley; 2009) 
Hanzo, L., Yang, L-L., Kuan, E.L. and Yen, K. Single- and Multi-Carrier DS-CDMA: Multi-USer Detection, Space-Time Spreading, Synchronisation, Standards and Networking (Wiley; 2003)

References

External links
Google Scholar profile
University of Southampton biography

Fellow Members of the IEEE
Living people
Academics of the University of Southampton
English engineers
Year of birth missing (living people)